Ed West may refer to:

 Ed West (American football) (born 1961), American football tight end
 Ed West (fighter) (born 1983), American mixed martial artist
 Ed West (journalist), British journalist